Siti Nurhaliza  is the second album from Malaysian singer Siti Nurhaliza of the same name which was released in 1997.

Recorded after the release of her debut self-titled album (1996). Siti Nurhaliza II was Siti Nurhaliza's two of six collaborations with Adnan Abu Hassan. For the first time of Siti's career, she wrote the lyrics for the song, "Demi Kasih Kita".

Production
Siti Nurhaliza II was produced by Suria Records for Siti Nurhaliza in 1997, a year after she release her debut album and marks her second collaboration with Adnan Abu Hassan.

Her first single, "Aku Cinta Padamu" became her breakthrough hits in Indonesia and retitled as "Betapa Ku Cinta Padamu" for the Indonesian version. The song also covered in English version as "I Wonder" by an Australian boy band North, in their second album, Straight Up. Siti Nurhaliza covered English song "The Colour of My Love" originally performed by Celine Dion who considered by Siti as her idol, from her 1993 album of the same title. For the song "Rindu Di Antara Kita", it features vocals by Siti Nurhaliza and Ciang Teng, where Siti sung in Malay while Ciang Teng sung in Mandarin.

Adnan Abu Hassan, the album's producer contributes three songs in the album — "Demi Kasih Kita", "Wajah Kekasih" and "Rindu Di Antara Kita". Other musicians contributes their songs in the album are husband and wife LY and Baiduri ("Aku Cinta Padamu" and "Kesilapanku, Keegoanmu"), Fauzi Marzuki, Zul Mahat, Xiao Wong, Helen Yap, Arthur Ganov and David Foster.

Release and reception
Siti Nurhaliza II was released on 27 January 1997 (17 days after Siti Nurhaliza celebrates her 18th birthday) and was well-received, sold over 400, 000 copies and being certified 6× platinum. Ten music videos were produced for Siti Nurhaliza II. The first single from the album, "Aku Cinta Padamu", where its music video was filmed at the foreground of Kuala Lumpur Tower. For the "Bisikan Asmara" music video, Siti Nurhaliza was accompanied by two male dancers in a white background studio.

Siti Nurhaliza II was reported to have sold more than 500,000 units in Indonesia alone.

Track listing

Credits
Credits adapted from Siti Nurhaliza II booklet liner notes.

 Aidiet – guitar
 Ariffin – promotional unit
 Azmeer – keyboard
 Baiduri – songwriter
 Bong – bass
 Kesuma Booty – programming, guitar
 Chobib – guitar
 David Foster – producer
 Arthur Ganov – songwriter
 Habsah Hassan – songwriter
 Adnan Abu Hassan – producer, programming
 A.D. Ho – photography
 Sham Amir Hussain – creation
 Jason Foo – production coordinator
 Zul Mahat – producer
 Zulkefli Majid – A & R coordinator
 Mahmud – percussion
 Fauzi Marzuki – producer, programming, guitar
 Hani M.J – songwriter

 Jari – saxophone
 Siti Nurhaliza – songwriter
 Nurul – make-up, hair stylist
 Lau – engineer, mixing
 LY – producer
 Amran Omar – songwriter
 Rahayu – promotional unit
 Riz – promotional unit
 Sabariah – promotional unit (Singapore)
 S. Amin Shahab – songwriter
 Soon – creation
 S.L. Tan – executive producer
 Ciang Teng – songwriter, vocals
 Ucu – songwriter
 Vincent – engineer, mixing
 Wong – engineer, mixing
 Xiao Wong – producer
 Helen Yap – producer, programming, piano

Notes

References

1997 albums
Siti Nurhaliza albums
Suria Records albums
Malay-language albums
Siti Nurhaliza video albums